N. spectabilis may refer to:

Neoastelia spectabilis, a flowering plant species
Neocrepidodera spectabilis, a beetle species
Neoregelia spectabilis, a flowering plant species
Nepenthes spectabilis, a pitcher plant species